Mark David Kelly (born 7 October 1966 in Blackpool) is an English former professional footballer.

Career

Kelly began his career at Shrewsbury Town, but never made a league appearance for the side. In 1987, he became Cardiff City manager Frank Burrows first signing of the season and went on to make his debut on the opening day of the season in a 1–1 draw with Leyton Orient. He appeared in a total of thirty-six matches in his first season and was a regular in the side for another two years before joining Fulham in 1990. He spent three seasons at the London club before dropping out of professional football.

References

1966 births
English footballers
Shrewsbury Town F.C. players
Cardiff City F.C. players
Fulham F.C. players
English Football League players
Living people
Association football midfielders